Cacocum is a municipality and town in the Holguín Province of Cuba.

Overview
It is located south of the city of Holguín and east of the Frank País International Airport towards the city of Bayamo on the Carretera Central Highway. The area includes extremely flat ground stretching south to the municipality's boundaries with Granma Province. Its territory is bounded on the west by Las Tunas Province, and on the east with the Báguanos municipality, its nearest neighbor.

Carretera Central and the Central Railroad pass near the Cacocum townsite, the most populated settlement of this municipality. Two local sugar mills, called Antonio Maceo and Cristino Naranjo represent Cacocum's main economic activity.

Demographics
In 2004, the municipality of Cacocum had a population of 42,623.

See also
List of cities in Cuba
Municipalities of Cuba

References

External links

Populated places in Holguín Province